Levolution may refer to:
 Levolution, a feature of Frostbite (game engine)
 Levolution (album)